Otherside is an album by American jazz saxophonist Oliver Lake featuring a quintet and a big band, which was recorded in 1988 and released on the Gramavision label. The big band pieces were commissioned by the Jazz Coalition with funding from the Massachusetts Council on the Arts and Humanities New Works Program.

Reception

In his review for AllMusic, Scott Yanow states " The often ferocious ensembles are memorable, and the rendition of 'Dedication to Dolphy' is particularly noteworthy. Fans of advanced jazz will want to get this underrated releases."

Track listing
All compositions by Oliver Lake.
 "Gano Club" – 4:23
 "Whitestone" – 9:30
 "Stand" – 5:08
 "Hymn for the Old Year" – 5:18
 "Weave Song II" – 9:08
 "Dedicated to Dolphy" – 18:29
A & R Recording, New York City except "Dedicated to Dolphy" recorded live on April 17, 1988 at Somerville Theatre, Somerville, Massachusetts.

Personnel
Quintet
Oliver Lake - saxophone
Geri Allen – piano
Anthony Peterson – guitar
Fred Hopkins – double bass
Andrew Cyrille – drums

Big Band
Oliver Lake, Greg Osby, Marty Ehrlich, John Stubblefield, Matt Darriau, Jay Branford - saxophone
Stanton Davis, Baikida Carroll, Roy Okutani – trumpet
Frank Lacy, Al Patterson, Josh Roseman – trombone
Pete Cirelli – bass trombone
Mark Taylor, W. Marshall Sealy – French horn
Michele Rosewoman – piano
Leon Dorsey – bass
Gene Lake – drums

References

1988 albums
Oliver Lake albums
Gramavision Records albums